Washington Parish School Board is a school district headquartered in Franklinton, Louisiana, United States.

The district serves most of Washington Parish. However Bogalusa, Rio, and some unincorporated areas are in Bogalusa City Schools.

School uniforms
All Washington Parish schools are required to adopt school uniforms for students.

Schools

PK-12 schools
 Mount Hermon School (Unincorporated area)

6-12 schools
 Franklinton High School (Franklinton)
 Pine Junior/Senior High School (Unincorporated area)
 Varnado High School (Varnado)

6-8 schools
 Angie Junior High School (Angie)
 Franklinton Junior High School (Franklinton)

PK-6 schools
 Enon Elementary School (Unincorporated area)

PK-5 schools
 Wesley Ray Elementary School (Unincorporated area)
 Thomas Elementary School (Unincorporated area)
 Varnado Elenmentary School (Unincorporated area)

3-5 schools
 Franklinton Elementary School (Franklinton)

PK-2 schools
 Franklinton Primary School (Franklinton)

References

External links
 Washington Parish School Board

School districts in Louisiana
School Board